Remo Ruffini (born May 17, 1942, La Brigue, Alpes-Maritimes, at that time, Briga Marittima, Italy). He is the Director of ICRANet, International Centre for Relativistic Astrophysics Network and the President of the International Centre for Relativistic Astrophysics (ICRA). Ruffini initiated the International Relativistic Astrophysics PhD (IRAP PhD), a common graduate school program of several universities and research institutes for the education of theoretical astrophysicists. He is the Director of the Erasmus Mundus IRAP PhD program (IRAP Ph D Erasmus Mundus). He has been Professor of Theoretical Physics at the University of Rome "Sapienza" from 1978 to 2012.

Biography
After his degree in 1966 in Rome, he was post-doctoral fellow at the Mainz Academy of Sciences working with Pascual Jordan, in Germany. Then, he was post-doctoral fellow with John Archibald Wheeler and Member of the Institute for Advanced Study in Princeton and later became instructor and assistant professor at Princeton University. In 1975, he was visiting Professor at the Universities of Kyoto (Japan) and of Western Australia, Perth. In the years 1975–78, he cooperated with NASA being member of the task force on the scientific use of space stations. In 1976 he became Professor of Theoretical Physics at the University of Catania and in 1978 he was appointed Professor at the University "Sapienza". In 1985, he was elected President of the International Center for Relativistic Astrophysics (ICRA). In 1984 he was cofounder, with Abdus Salam, of the Marcel Grossmann Meetings. In 1987, he became co-chairman of the Italian-Korean Meetings on Relativistic Astrophysics. In the years 1989–93, he was President of the Scientific Committee of the Italian Space Agency. He is Editor of a variety of Scientific Journals. He is married to Anna Imponente and has a son, Iacopo.

His theoretical work led to the concept of Boson Stars. His classic  article with John A. Wheeler popularized the astrophysical concept of Black Hole. With Demetrios Christodoulou he has given the formula for a Kerr-Newmann Black Hole endowed of charge, mass and angular momentum. His theoretical work led to the identification of the first Black Holes in the Milky Way Galaxy.

Together with his student C. Rhoades, he established the absolute upper limit to the mass of neutron stars. With his student Robert Leach, he used such an upper limit for fixing the paradigm which enabled the identification of the first Black Hole in the Milky Way Galaxy, Cygnus X1, using the splendid data of the Uhuru satellite by Riccardo Giacconi and his group.

For these works Ruffini won the A. Cressy Morrison Award of the New York Academy of Sciences in 1972.

With his students Calzetti, Giavalisco, Song and Taraglio, Ruffini developed the role of fractal structures in Cosmology.

Together with his collaborator T. Damour, Ruffini suggested the applicability of the Heisenberg-Euler-Schwinger process of pair creation in Black Hole physics and identified the dyadosphere where these processes take place. Gamma ray bursts (GRBs) seem to give the observational evidence of such pair creation process in astrophysics, prior to the observation of such phenomenon in Earth based experiments and represent the first evidence of the energy extraction process from Black Holes (the blackholic energy).

Bird's-eye view of our black-hole universe

An external observer would see our black-hole universe as a sphere of space that is being sucked into its central wormhole:
The drain hole sucking water toward it is equivalent to the singularity at the center of a black hole sucking space toward it.
—Sen, Paul. Einstein's Fridge: How the Difference Between Hot and Cold Explains the Universe Simon and Schuster, 2022, p. 228
Consequently, our black-hole universe shrinks ever faster, spins ever faster, and has an ever deeper funnel-shaped vortex at its north pole:
<p>
To us, falling towards the central singularity, our shrinking black-hole universe seems to be expanding:
Now let us consider an astronaut explorer who goes to visit a black hole and falls in. According to her own proper time, the explorer can soon arrive in the vicinity of the horizon. Any light emitted at rS in the outward radial direction as she falls in stays at the horizon, according to outer observers, but travels at c relative to the astronaut. Therefore, in the astronaut's rest frame the horizon moves outwards at c.
—Steane, Andrew M. Relativity Made Relatively Easy OUP, 2012, pp. 388–89

Books
He is co-author of 21 books, including:
R. Giacconi and R. Ruffini, Physics and Astrophysics of Neutron Stars and Black Holes, LXXV E. Fermi Summer School, SIF and North Holland (1978); also translated into Russian
R. Giacconi and R. Ruffini, Physics and Astrophysics of Neutron Stars and Black Holes 2nd edition, Cambridge Scientific Publishers, Cambridge (2009)
R. Gursky and R. Ruffini, Neutron Stars, Black Holes and Binary X Ray Sources, H. Reidel (1975)
H. Ohanian and R. Ruffini. Gravitation and Spacetime, W.W. Norton (1994); translated into Italian (Bologna: Zanichelli, 1997), Chinese (China Science Publishing, 2007) and Korean (Seoul: Shin Won, 2001)
Bardeen, et al., Black Holes, Gordon & Breach (1973)
M. Rees, J.A. Wheeler and R. Ruffini, Black Holes, Gravitational Waves and Cosmology, Gordon & Breach (1974)
H. Sato and R. Ruffini, Black Holes, Tokyo (1976)
L.Z. Fang and R. Ruffini, Basic Concepts in Relativistic Astrophysics, Beijing: Science Press (1981)
F. Melchiorri and R. Ruffini, Gamow Cosmology, North Holland Pub. Co., (1986)

Awards
A. Cressy Morrison Award, from the New York Academy of Sciences (1972)
Alfred P. Sloan Fellow Foundation (1974)
Space Scientist of the Year (1992)
Gravity Research Foundation Award 1970, 1971, 2019

See also
Ergosphere
Schrödinger–Newton equation

References

External links
    web page Remo Ruffini
 (Publications)
  ICRANet
 (IRAP).
 List of publications

1942 births
Living people
People from Alpes-Maritimes
Italian relativity theorists
Sapienza University of Rome alumni
Academic staff of the Sapienza University of Rome
Institute for Advanced Study visiting scholars
Fellows of the American Physical Society
Sloan Research Fellows